is the 8th single by the Japanese girl idol group 9nine,  released in Japan on December 21, 2011, on the label SME Records (a subsidiary of Sony Music Entertainment Japan).

The physical CD single debuted at number 12 in the Oricon weekly singles chart.

Background 
The song "Tick Tock 2Nite" was the theme song of a Ranma ½ live-action TV special (dorama) titled Ranma ½ Live-action Special and premiered in Japan on NTV on December 9, 2011.

Release 
The single was released in four versions: three limited editions (Limited Edition A, Limited Edition B, and Limited Edition C) and a regular edition. Each edition had a different cover. All the limited editions included a bonus DVD.

Track listing

Charts

References

External links 
  (The video is available only in Japan.)
 Limited Edition A at Sony Music

2011 singles
Japanese-language songs
9nine songs
2011 songs
SME Records singles
Japanese television drama theme songs
Ranma ½
Song articles with missing songwriters